Darreh-ye Gazeh (also Romanized as Darreh-ye Gāzeh and Darrehgazeh) is a village in Dehshir Rural District, in the Central District of Taft County, Yazd Province, Iran. At the 2006 census, its population was 20, in 9 families.

References 

Populated places in Taft County